Encounter with the Unknown is a 1972 American anthology horror film directed by Harry Thomason in his directorial debut, and narrated by Rod Serling. It features three allegedly true stories involving the supernatural. The film was produced by Centronics International, an Arkansas-based studio founded by Thomason.

Plot
The film presents three allegedly true stories of the supernatural. The first story, "The Heptagon", opens on a somber note at the funeral of college student Johnny Davis. His friends Dave, Frank and Randy are in attendance at the burial. It is revealed that they played a seemingly innocent phone prank on Johnny, telling him to go to a certain address where a date was waiting. The old woman who lived at the address accidentally shot Johnny to death. As the funeral service ends, Johnny's mother (who is the seventh daughter of a seventh son) recites a cryptic message to the three young men she blames for the death of her son: "One by land, two by sky...seven times around go the three of you, and may your reward be just and true." Later Frank relates this story to a priest, Father Duane, sitting next to him on a plane. He says that Dave was run over and killed seven days after the funeral. The priest tries to ease Frank's anxiety,  assuring him that it's all a coincidence. However, after Father Duane exits the plane, it crashes upon takeoff. On the runway Father Duane attempts to comfort a dying Frank, who tells him that exactly fourteen days have passed since Johnny's burial. The troubled priest—beginning to suspect that there might be more to this pattern of deaths than mere chance—speaks to his superior, who suggests telephoning the remaining young man at the state university. Father Duane tries to call Randy but instead reaches his roommate, who tells him that Randy has gone skydiving. It is now twenty-one days after Johnny's burial, the narrator reminds us, and according to Mrs. Davis's prophecy, two of the young men would perish by sky.

The second story, "The Darkness", is set in rural Missouri during the early twentieth century and involves the disappearance of a boy's dog in the vicinity of a mysterious hole in the ground. Concerned about the inexplicable moaning sounds coming from the hole, the boy's father agrees to be lowered in on a rope to see if he can recover the dog and to find out what's making the noise. Suddenly a terrifying scream emerges from the depths of the pit and the boy's father, now a raving lunatic, is hoisted back up. The mystery of the hole is never solved, and the story closes with the narrator's revelation that the father spent the rest of his life in an insane asylum.

The final segment, "The Girl on the Bridge", involves a strange disoriented girl and the Arkansas state senator who attempts to give her a ride home. Most of the story unfolds via the girl's flashbacks; as the senator and his wife arrive at the address the girl had given them, they find that she has mysteriously vanished from the back seat of the car. The girl's elderly father answers the door, telling the senator that his daughter died in a car accident many years earlier when she and her boyfriend were leaving town to get married. The father had disapproved of the relationship and told his daughter that he would rather see her dead.

According to the opening narration, the stories are based on research conducted by Dr. Jonathan Rankin, a parapsychologist, but this is evidently a fictional device as no record of the name "Jonathan Rankin" exists in the annals of para-psychological research. One of the segments, "The Girl on the Bridge", is simply a version of the Vanishing hitchhiker, a widespread and very popular urban legend. The stories themselves are narrated by Rod Serling, but the opening and closing portions of the film feature a second, uncredited narrator.

Cast

Production
Encounters with the Unknown marked the feature film debut of Harry Thomason, and the first film produced by Thomason's production company, Centronics International, which was based in Little Rock, Arkansas. The studio's second feature, So Sad About Gloria (1973), was filmed simultaneous to Encounter with the Unknown.

Numerous exterior locations were filmed in the Ozarks region of Arkansas. Some filming took place in the city of Little Rock, at the Capital Hotel and Mount Holly Cemetery.

Release
Encounter with the Unknown was given a regional theatrical release in the United States, first having its premiere in Little Rock, Arkansas on October 17, 1972 at the United Artists Cinema 150 theater.  It opened at other theaters in Little Rock two days later on October 20, 1972.  It later opened in Indianapolis and Shreveport, Louisiana on November 30, 1972, and in Kansas City, Missouri on December 6, 1972.

Soundtrack
Robert Farrar
Becky Fain - "Rememberin' (How It Used To Be)"
Johnny Pearson - "Graveyard" and "Sleepy Shores"

See also
 List of American films of 1973

References

External links

The Bloody Pit of Horror - Encounter with the Unknown
Arkansas.com, movie locations

1972 films
1972 horror films
American horror anthology films
American supernatural horror films
American mystery films
Films shot in Arkansas
1970s English-language films
Films directed by Harry Thomason
1970s American films